Dominic Meier is a Swiss practical sport shooter who is 8 time Swiss national champion. He joined the Swiss national team at the end of 1993 and is today one of the most successful IPSC shooters in Switzerland.

References 

Living people
IPSC shooters
1969 births